Sam Groth and Chris Guccione were the defending champions, but Guccione chose not to participate this year. Groth played alongside Leander Paes, but lost in the semifinals to Aisam-ul-Haq Qureshi and Rajeev Ram.

Qureshi and Ram went on to win the title, defeating Matt Reid and John-Patrick Smith in the final, 6–4, 4–6, [10–7].

Seeds

Draw

Draw

References 
 Draw

2017 Hall of Fame Tennis Championships